Donn Charles Fendler (August 29, 1926 – October 9, 2016) was an American author and public speaker from Rye, New York. In July 1939 at the age of 12, he got separated from his family and became lost on Maine's Mount Katahdin. His disappearance launched a manhunt which became front page news throughout the nation and involved hundreds of volunteers. Donn survived for nine days without food or proper clothing, before following a stream and telephone line out of the woods near Stacyville, Maine. Fendler was dehydrated, covered with insect bites, and 16 pounds lighter than at the beginning of his odyssey, but otherwise unharmed. He credited his experience as a Boy Scout in helping him survive the ordeal.

Biography 
Donn Fendler was born in 1926 in Rye, New York. He died on October 9, 2016, in Bangor, Maine at the age of 90.

On July 17, 1939, 12-year-old  Fendler was separated from his family during a storm near the summit of Maine's Mount Katahdin. His disappearance launched a manhunt which became front page news throughout the nation, and involved hundreds of volunteers who went looking for him throughout Baxter State Park. Fendler survived for 9 days without food or proper clothing before following a stream and telephone line out of the woods near Stacyville, Maine. He stumbled into a hunting camp  from the place he had gone missing. Fendler was dehydrated, covered with insect bites, and  lighter than at the beginning of his odyssey, but otherwise unharmed. He credited his experience as a Boy Scout in helping him survive by remembering that he should follow the stream downhill, by eating what he could find, and attempting to shield himself as best as possible during the frigid nights.

He then wrote a book following his journey, Lost On A Mountain In Maine, with help from Joseph B. Egan, which has become a Maine children's classic. Written from his perspective as a young boy, Donn tells his harrowing story from start to finish. He tells of experiencing hallucinations due to fatigue and hunger, as well as losing most of his clothing. After his rescue, President Franklin D. Roosevelt presented him with the Army & Navy Legion of Valor's annual medal  for outstanding youth hero of 1939. Donn was feted with a parade in his honor, and featured in an article in Life Magazine. For almost seventy years he was called on to recount his story. On the 70th anniversary of the event, Donn was interviewed by the Bangor Daily News and said that he survived not only by eating berries, but by his "never-give-up attitude," his faith in God and his prayers. Mothers from all over the United States sent prayers to his mother by Western Union. "They did that in those days," he said. "I think it worked, because I am still standing here," he said. In September 1998, a map was published with the trail he'd followed.

Filmmakers Derek Desmond and Ryan Cook are attempting to produce a feature film dramatization about the events of the book, also titled Lost on a Mountain in Maine.  Earlier, the same filmmakers produced a documentary, Finding Donn Fendler: Lost On A Mountain In Maine 72 Years Later that related the story of the repurchase of the film rights to Donn's life, which had been sold years earlier.

In November 2011, his story was published as a graphic novel to reach a new generation of readers.

At the time of his death, Fendler had been living in Clarksville, Tennessee, but spending his summers in Newport, Maine. Each fall he would visit schools in Maine to tell his story and answer children's questions about his experience on the mountain.

On July 25, 2014, the 75th anniversary of the day Fendler was finally found, Maine Gov. Paul LePage declared the day "Donn Fendler Day."

References 

1926 births
2016 deaths
Formerly missing people
People from Clarksville, Tennessee
People from Rye, New York
People from Newport, Maine